Sou is a type of dried flaky Chinese pastry, which use Chinese flaky pastry, found in a variety of Chinese cuisines.

Dim sum
In dim sum restaurants, char siu sou (叉燒酥) is the most common version available. Other varieties may include century egg and lotus seed paste. These are commonly found in Hong Kong or Singapore in Asia. They may occasionally be found in some overseas Chinatowns.

Shanghai cuisine
In Shanghai cuisine, a number of dried varieties are available, such as peanut sou (花生酥), green bean sou (綠豆酥) or walnut sou (核桃酥). People often buy them for souvenirs in boxed forms.

Gallery

See also
 Chinese flaky pastry
Char siu bao
 Ox-tongue pastry

References

Dim sum
Shanghai cuisine
Chinese pastries